Musaed Neda Al-Enazi is a Kuwaiti football player. He currently plays for Al Qadisiya.

Neda scored the first goals of a free directly in the final match against Kuwait Club.  He scored three goals from direct free kicks in a game Qadisiya 3 v.s Kuwait 0.  Neda scored three goals, 2 goals from direct free kicks and 1 penalty kick, in a game qadsia v.s Umm-Salal Sports Club Gulf Cup.

International goals

Score and Result list shows Kuwait's goal tally first

|-
| 1. || 3 September 2003 || National Stadium, Kallang, Singapore ||  ||  ||  || 2004 AFC Asian Cup qualification
|-
| 2. || 9 June 2004 || Al-Sadaqua Walsalam Stadium, Kuwait City, Kuwait ||  ||  ||  || 2006 FIFA World Cup qualification
|-
| 3. || 8 September 2004 || Siu Sai Wan Sports Ground, Chai Wan, Hong Kong ||  ||  ||  || 2006 FIFA World Cup qualification
|-
| 4. || 11 December 2004 || Thani bin Jassim Stadium, Doha, Qatar ||  ||  ||  || 2004 Gulf Cup of Nations
|-
| 5. || 7 January 2009 || Sultan Qaboos Sports Complex, Muscat, Oman ||  ||  ||  || 2009 Gulf Cup of Nations
|-
| 6. || 5 March 2009 || Canberra Stadium, Canberra, Australia ||  ||  ||  || 2011 AFC Asian Cup qualification
|-
| 7. || 3 November 2009 || Al-Sadaqua Walsalam Stadium, Kuwait City, Kuwait ||  ||  ||  || Friendly
|-
| 8. || 8 November 2009 || Al-Sadaqua Walsalam Stadium, Kuwait City, Kuwait ||  ||  ||  || Friendly
|-
| 9. || 24 December 2010 || Dream Land Playing Field, Cairo, Egypt ||  ||  ||  || Friendly
|-
| 10. || rowspan="2"| 31 December 2010 || rowspan="2"| As-Suwais Stadium, Suez, Egypt || rowspan="2"|  ||  || rowspan="2"|  || rowspan="2"| Friendly
|-
| 11. || 
|-
| 12. || rowspan="2"| 2 July 2011 || rowspan="2"| Camille Chamoun Sports City Stadium, Beirut, Lebanon || rowspan="2"|  ||  || rowspan="2"|  || rowspan="2"| Friendly
|-
| 13. || 
|-
| 14. || 23 July 2011 || Mohammed Al-Hamad Stadium, Hawally, Kuwait ||  ||  ||  || 2014 FIFA World Cup qualification
|-
| 15. || 11 October 2011 || Camille Chamoun Sports City Stadium, Beirut ||  ||  ||  || Friendly
|-
| 16. || 4 November 2014 || Al Nahyan Stadium, Abu Dhabi, United Arab Emirates ||  ||  ||  || Friendly
|-
| 17. || 30 March 2015 || Mohammed Bin Zayed Stadium, Abu Dhabi, United Arab Emirates ||  ||  ||  || Friendly
|}

See also
 List of men's footballers with 100 or more international caps

References

External links
 
 

1983 births
Living people
Kuwaiti footballers
Kuwaiti expatriate footballers
Association football midfielders
Al-Wakrah SC players
Kuwait international footballers
2011 AFC Asian Cup players
2015 AFC Asian Cup players
Al Nassr FC players
Al-Shabab FC (Riyadh) players
FIFA Century Club
Footballers at the 2002 Asian Games
Al-Orobah FC players
Sportspeople from Kuwait City
Saudi Professional League players
Qatar Stars League players
Asian Games competitors for Kuwait
Expatriate footballers in Saudi Arabia
Expatriate footballers in Qatar
Kuwaiti expatriate sportspeople in Saudi Arabia
Kuwaiti expatriate sportspeople in Qatar
Kuwait Premier League players
Qadsia SC players
Al Salmiya SC players